Fronteira dos Vales is a Brazilian municipality located in the north-east of the state of Minas Gerais. The city belongs to the statistical mesoregion of Vale do Mucuri and to the statistical microregion of Nanuque. It became a municipality in 1963.

The nearest major population centre is Teófilo Otoni. The name came about because of the position between the two river valleys.

Neighboring municipalities are: Santa Helena de Minas, Águas Formosas, Machacalis and Joaíma.

The main economic activities are services, and subsistence agriculture. The GDP in 2005 was R$12 million, with 9 million from services, 1 million from industry, and 2 million from agriculture. Only 5 farms had tractors (2006). 1,000 persons were dependent on agriculture. The main crops were coconuts, sugarcane, beans, and corn. There were 16,000 head of cattle (2006). There were no banks (2007) and 65 automobiles (98 motorcycles), giving a ratio of 75 inhabitants per automobile.

The social indicators rank it in the bottom tier of municipalities in the state.
Municipal Human Development Index: 0.599 (2000)
State ranking: 835 out of 853 municipalities 
National ranking: 4,675 out of 5,138 municipalities  
Literacy rate: 59%
Life expectancy: 67 (average of males and females)

The highest ranking municipality in Minas Gerais in 2000 was Poços de Caldas with 0.841, while the lowest was Setubinha with 0.568. Nationally the highest was São Caetano do Sul in São Paulo with 0.919, while the lowest was Setubinha. In more recent statistics (considering 5,507 municipalities) Manari in the state of Pernambuco has the lowest rating in the country—0,467—putting it in last place.

There were 6 health clinics and no hospitals (2006). Patients with more serious health conditions are transported to Teófilo Otoni. Educational needs were met by 6 primary schools, 1 middle school, and 1 pre-primary school.

References

See also
 List of municipalities in Minas Gerais

Municipalities in Minas Gerais